David Gindler is an American lawyer and philanthropist. He is the head of the Intellectual Property Litigation and Licensing Group at Milbank and was previously the managing partner of Irell & Manella. He has donated—with his wife, Kiki Ramos Gindler—more than $2 million to the Los Angeles Master Chorale. He is a 1981 graduate of Pomona College, where he met his wife and worked at the radio station KSPC.

References

American philanthropists
Pomona College alumni
American lawyers
Year of birth missing (living people)
Living people